Fiends of Dope Island is the eighth and final studio album (and 13th album overall) by the American rock band the Cramps. The Cramps resurrected their own record label Vengeance Records to release the album in 2003. It was recorded in Hollywood in August 2002. It was self-produced by Poison Ivy and Lux Interior. The album takes its title from the 1959 film, Fiend of Dope Island. "Fissure of Rolando" was dedicated to John Agar (1921-2002).

Track listing

Personnel
The Cramps
Lux Interior - vocals, harmonica, maracas
Poison Ivy Rorschach - guitars, echo-theremin
Chopper Franklin - bass guitar, rhythm guitar on "Taboo"
Harry Drumdini - drums
Technical
Rocky Schenck - photography
Jimmy Hole - "lurid" layout
Lux Interior - typography "fiends lettering"
Mixed and mastered at Earle Mankey's Psychedelic Shack, Thousand Oaks, California

Notes and references

2003 albums
The Cramps albums